Dlamini is a surname, common in Eswatini and neighbouring parts of South Africa. People with the surname Dlamini include:

List 
The House of Dlamini: The reigning royal family of eSwatini
Absalom Dlamini
Amala Ratna Zandile Dlamini, also known as Doja Cat
Ayanda Dlamini
Barnabas Sibusiso Dlamini
Barnes Dlamini
Bathabile Dlamini
Bheki Dlamini
Bhekimpi Dlamini
Prince Cedza Dlamini
Dlamini King Brothers
Prince Guduza Dlamini
Jacob Zambuhle Bhekuyise Dlamini
Prince Jameson Mbilini Dlamini
Lutfo Dlamini
Prince Mabandla Dlamini
Prince Makhosini Dlamini
Malungisa Dlamini
Mandla Dlamini
Queen Mantfombi Dlamini-Zulu, consort of Goodwill Zwelithini kaBhekuzulu, the late Zulu king
Maphevu Dlamini
Maxwell Dlamini, president of the Swaziland National Union of Students
Mbandzeni (also known as Dlamini IV)
Prince Mfanasibili of Swaziland (formerly Mfanasibili Dlamini)
Mfanzile Dlamini
Moses Mathendele Dlamini
Mphiwa Dlamini
King Mswati III (born Prince Makhosetive Dlamini)
Nhlanhla Dlamini
Nicholas Dlamini, professional bicycle racer
Nkosazana Dlamini-Zuma
Nkosing'phile Dlamini, Miss World contestant
Obed Dlamini
Phesheya Mbongeni Dlamini
Phinda Dlamini
Phindiwe Sangweni, born as HRH Princess Phindiwe Rita Dlamini
Queen Sibongile Winifred Dlamini-Zulu, first consort of Goodwill Zwelithini kaBhekuzulu, the late Zulu king
Sibusiso Dlamini
Princess Sikhanyiso Dlamini
Sihawu Dlamini
Siza Dlamini
King Sobhuza I (Ngwane IV) Dlamini
Sotsha Dlamini
Prince Sozisa Dlamini
Stanley Dlamini, commander of the Umbutfo Eswatini Defence Force
Themba Dlamini
Zanele Dlamini Mbeki, former First Lady of South Africa
Zola, aka Bonginkosi Dlamini

Bantu-language surnames